Tetramelas pulverulentus is a species of lichenicolous (lichen-dwelling) fungus in the family Caliciaceae. It was originally described as a new species by Martino Anzi in 1860. The type specimen was collected in Italy. Swedish lichenologists Anders Nordin and Leif Tibell transferred it to the genus Tetramelas in 2005 based on molecular phylogenetic analysis. It is closely related to Tetramelas phaeophysciae but differs from that species in its ascospores, which have three septa.

References

Caliciales
Lichen species
Lichens described in 1860
Lichens of Europe
Taxa named by Martino Anzi